The FGF-1 internal ribosome entry site (IRES) is an RNA element present in the 5' UTR of the mRNA of fibroblast growth factor-1 and allows cap-independent translation. It is thought that FGF-1 internal ribosome entry site (IRES) activity is strictly controlled and highly tissue specific.

References

External links 
 

Cis-regulatory RNA elements